"No Tears to Cry" is a song by Italian Eurodance project Whigfield which was actually recorded by the singer Annerley Gordon and performed on stage by the Danish model Sannie Charlotte Carlson. It is written by Annerley Gordon, Davide Riva and Paul Sears, and was the second single release from her album, Whigfield II, in Europe and Scandinavia. The single reached number 30 on the Eurochart Hot 100.

Track listing
CD maxi

 Europe
 No Tears To Cry (Original Radio Version) 	3:51
 No Tears To Cry (Original Extended Version) 	5:26
 No Tears To Cry (MBRG Edited Version) 	3:30
 No Tears To Cry (MBRG Extended) 	        6:12
 No Tears To Cry (Organ Mix) 	                3:46

Scandinavia
 No Tears To Cry (Original Extended Version) 	5:26
 No Tears To Cry (Original Radio Version) 	3:51
 No Tears To Cry (MBRG Extended) 	        6:12
 No Tears To Cry (MBRG Edited Version) 	3:30
 No Tears To Cry (Organ Mix) 	                3:46

Personnel
Executive Producer – Larry Pignagnoli
Producers – Davide Riva, Larry Pignagnoli
Written by Annerley Gordon, Davide Riva, Paul Sears

Charts

References

1997 singles
Whigfield songs
Songs written by Ann Lee (singer)
1997 songs